The University of Lucknow (informally known as Lucknow University, and LU) is a public state university based in Lucknow, Uttar Pradesh. Founded in 1920, the University of Lucknow is one of the oldest government owned institutions of higher education in India. LU's main campus is located at Badshah Bagh, University Road area of the city with a second campus at Jankipuram.

LU is a teaching, residential and affiliating university, organized into more than 500 colleges and 17 institutes, located throughout the city and other surrounding areas. The University has jurisdiction over colleges of 4 districts: Raebareli, Hardoi, Sitapur and Lakhimpur Kheri. The university is opening a third campus in Sitapur district where vocational and skill development courses will be offered.

The University of Lucknow is one of two Public Universities in the State of Uttar Pradesh to be accredited with A++ status by the National Assessment and Accreditation Council.

History
The idea of establishing a university at Lucknow was conceived by Raja Sir Mohammad Ali Mohammad Khan, Khan Bahadur, K.C.I.E. of Mahmudabad. He contributed an article in then popular newspaper, The Pioneer, urging the foundation of a university at Lucknow. Later Sir Harcourt Butler was appointed Lieutenant-Governor of the United Provinces, and was also made Mohammad Khan's well-known interest in all matters, specially in educational matters. The first step to bring the university into being was taken when a General Committee of educationists and persons interested in university education appointed for the purpose, met in conference at Government House, Lucknow, on 10 November 1919. At this meeting Sir Harcourt Butler, being the chairman of the committee, outlined the proposed scheme for the new university.

Eventually, The King George's Medical College (today's King George's Medical University), The Canning College, The Isabella Thoburn College provided structural as well as educational and administrational help for the establishment of the university.

Campus

In the early days, the Canning College had no building of its own, and the scene of its activity periodically changed as one or other building proved unsuitable or insufficient. During the first twelve years, the college was shifted from its original location, the Aminuddaulah Palace, to a number of places, one after another, including the Lal Baradari. At last, it was housed in its own building at Kaisar Bagh. The foundation stone of this new building was laid by the Viceroy, Sir John Lawrence, as far back as 13 November 1867, but the work of construction was not completed until 1878. On 15 November of that year, Sir George Couper, Lt. Commissioner of Avadh, formally opened the new building.

The Central Library of the university known as the Tagore Library is one of the richest libraries in the country. It was designed by Sir Walter Burley Griffin, the designer of Australian capital city of Canberra. It has 5.25 lakh books, 50,000 journals and approximately 10,000 copies of approved Ph.D. and D.Litt. dissertations. The whole library is online with its own website.

The university also provides residential facilities to teachers, students and non-teaching staff. There are overall 18 hostels for boys and girls in the university. Kailash Hall and Nivedita Hall can house nearly 600 female students. Extra-curricular and employment needs of the students are taken care of by various centres and associations, such as Delegacies, Athletic Association, Centre for Cultural Activities, Information and Employment Bureau and Centre for Information, Publication and Public Relations. An important feature of the university is the organization of regular National Service Scheme programmes to create awareness for social service amongst the students. The university also imparts military training to the students through its NCC Wing.

During the past 20 years, there has been an extension of the University Campus. This is borne out by the fact that a huge and majestic building, as part of the New Campus, has been constructed on 75 acres of land provided by the State Government on Sitapur Road near the Institute of Engineering and Technology.

Organisation and administration

Faculties
Faculty of Arts
 Departments
 Ancient Indian History and Archaeology
 Anthropology
 Arabic and Arab Culture
 Asian Culture
 Defence and Strategic Studies
 Economics
 English and Modern European Languages
Education (Pedagogy)
Forensic science (Running under the authority of the department of Anthropology).
 Geography
Hindi and Modern Indian Languages (Bangla, Tamil, Marathi)
 Home Science
 Journalism & Mass Communication
Jyotir Vigyan (Astrology)
 Library & Information Science
 Linguistics
 Medieval & Modern Indian History (MIH)
 Persian and Oriental Persian
 Oriental Sanskrit
 Oriental Arabic 
 Philosophy
 Political Science
 Population Studies
 Public Administration
 Psychology
 Sociology
 Social Work
 Sanskrit, Prakrit and Pali language 
Tourism and Travel Management
 Urdu
 Western History
 Women's & Gender Studies

Faculty of Commerce
 Departments
 Commerce (accounting, finance, marketing & management)
 Applied Economics
 Business Administration

Faculty of Education
 Department
 Education, Research & Development
 Physical Education & Sports Management

Faculty of Law
 Department
 Law

Faculty of Science
 Departments
Zoology
 Botany
 Chemistry
Geology
Physics
Mathematics
Astronomy
 Pharmaceutical Chemistry
Biochemistry
 Computer Science
 Statistics

Faculty of Engineering & Technology
 Departments
 Electronics and Communication Engineering (ECE)
 Civil Engineering (CE)http://udrc.lkouniv.ac.in/Department/DepartmentDetail/History?dept=59
 Computer Science and Engineering (CSE)http://udrc.lkouniv.ac.in/Department/DepartmentDetail/History?dept=58
 Electrical Engineering (EE) http://udrc.lkouniv.ac.in/Department/DepartmentDetail/History?dept=56
 Mechanical Engineering (ME) http://udrc.lkouniv.ac.in/Department/DepartmentDetail/History?dept=55
 Applied Sciences and Humanities http://udrc.lkouniv.ac.in/Department/DepartmentDetail/History?dept=72
Facilities under Faculty of Engineering & Technology
Training and Placement Cell, Faculty of Engineering & Technology,https://udrc.lkouniv.ac.in/Department/DepartmentDetail/History?dept=76
 Central Workshop
Faculty of Fine Arts
 Departments
 Fine arts
 Commercial art
 Art & Craft
 Graphics Design
 Sculpture
 Visual arts 
Faculty of Yoga and Alternative Medicine

 Departments
 Yoga
Naturopathy

Faculty of Ayurveda
 Department of Ayurveda

Faculty of Unani

 Department of Unani

Institute and centres
 Management Science
 Tourism Studies
 Abhinavgupt Institute of Aesthetics & Shaiva Philosophy
 APJ Abdul Kalam Centre for Innovation
 Institute of New and Renewable Energy
 Dr. Giri Lal Gupta Institute of Public Health
 Dr. Shankar Dayal Sharma Institute of Democracy
 Institute for Development of Advanced Computing
 Institute of Hydrocarbon, Energy & Geo-resources
 Institute of Wildlife Sciences
 ONGC Centre of Advanced Studies
 Population Research Centre
 Development Studies
 JK Institute of Sociology, Ecology and Human Relations
 Urban Studies
 Women Studies
 Centre for Cultural Texts, Records & Translation of Indian Literatures
 Institute of Human Consciousnes & Yogic Sciences 
 Food Processing and Technology
Mass Communication in Science & Technology
Pharmaceutical Sciences
Advanced Molecular Genetics & Infectious Diseases

Academics

Rankings

Notable alumni

Politics
 Arif Mohammad Khan (born 1951) - politician, columnist, former Union Minister, Governor of Kerala
 Ashutosh Tandon (born 1960) - cabinet minister in Government of Uttar Pradesh
 Atul Kumar Anjan, National Secretary of Communist Party of India
 Brajesh Pathak (born 1964) - former MP, currently Deputy Chief Minister of Uttar Pradesh
 Chandrapal Singh Yadav (born 1959) - Rajya Sabha Member
 Chaudhary Dilip Singh Chaturvedi (born 1932), former MLA, Bhind, MP; former LU President 1955-56
Dinesh Sharma (born 1964) - Deputy Chief Minister of Uttar Pradesh
 Abdul Ghafoor Ahmed (1927-2012) Pakistani politician, author, former Federal Minister for Industries and Production
 Harish Rawat (born 1948) - former Chief Minister of Uttarakhand
 K. C. Pant (1931-2012) - former Minister of Defence
 Lalji Tondon (1935-2020) - 22nd Governor of Madhya Pradesh, 28th Governor of Bihar
Pushkar Singh Dhami (born 1975) - Chief Minister of Uttarakhand
P.L Punia (born 1945) - Member of Rajya Sabha
Raghuraj Pratap Singh (Raja Bhaiya) (born 1969) - MLA
 Ram Govind Chaudhary (born 1946) - Leader of the Opposition in the Uttar Pradesh Legislative Assembly
Shankar Dayal Sharma (1918-1999) - 9th President of India
 Shivpal Singh Yadav (born 1955) - politician,MLA, Former-Cabinet Minister in the Government of Uttar Pradesh
 Surjit Singh Barnala (1925-2017) - former Governor of Tamil Nadu
 Sajjad Zaheer (1899-1973) - founding member of the Communist Party of Pakistan
 Syed Sibtey Razi (born 1939) - former Governor of Jharkhand
 Vijaya Raje Scindia (1919-2001) - late Rajmata of Gwalior
 Zafar Ali Naqvi (born 1948) - Member of Parliament
 Zakir Hussain (1897-1969) - third president of India
 Rajpal Kashyap – Member of Uttar Pradesh Legislative Council

Education and science
 S. P. Chakravarti (1904-1981) - father of Electronics and Telecommunications engineering education in India.
 Sanduk Ruit (born 1954) - founder of Tilganga Institute of Ophthalmology
 Harish Poptani, professor and chair of the center for Preclinical Imaging at the University of Liverpool
 Inder Verma (born 1947) - professor of Molecular Biology
 Atul Kumar, chemist
 C.M. Naim (born 1936) - writer and academic
 Vinod Bhakuni (1962-2011) - biophysicist
 Girjesh Govil (1940-2021) - molecular biophysicist
 Shyam Swarup Agarwal (1941-2013) - immunologist
 Rajendra Prasad, professor of Pulmonary Medicine
 Ravi Kant (born 1956) - professor of surgery
 Raj Kumar (born 1959) - professor of neurosurgery
 Ritu Karidhal (born 1975) - ISRO scientist
 Furqan Qamar (born 1960) - Professor of Management

Government
 Brajendranath De  (1852-1932) - early Indian member of the Indian Civil Service
 Isha Basant Joshi (1908-?) - India's first female IAS officer
 R N Kao (1918-2002) - Civil Servant, Founder and First director of R&AW

Literature
 Ali Jawad Zaidi (1916-2004) - poet, critic, writer and freedom fighter
 Ahmed Ali (1910-1994) - Pakistani novelist, short story writer and scholar
 Iftikhar Arif (born 1944) Urdu poet, scholar and intellectual
 Kavi Pradeep (1915-1998) - poet and lyricist
 Qurratulain Hyder (1927-2007) - Urdu writer and novelist
 Abdur Rahman Kashgari (1912-1971), Uyghur poet, writer, lexicographer and Islamic scholar
 Attia Hosain (1913-1998) - British-Indian novelist, author, writer, broadcaster, journalist and actor
 Vinod Mehta (1942-2015) - journalist, critic and writer
 Suresh Chandra Shukla (born 1954) - playwright, writer and actor
 Roshan Taqui (born 1958) - historian, writer

Law 
 Adarsh Sein Anand (1936-2017) - former Chief Justice of India and former Chairman of National Human Rights Commission
 Prafulla Chandra Pant (born 1952) - Former Judge, Supreme Court of India
 Vishwambhar Dayalu Tripathi (1899-1959) - lawyer and politician
 Mahendra Pal Singh (born 1940) - law scholar
 S.P. Singh (1937-2020) - jurist

Others
 Swami Chinmayananda (1916-1993) - founder of Chinmaya Mission
 V. Mohini Giri (born 1938) - social activist, Padma Bhushan
 Seema Mustafa (born 1955) - journalist
 Manoj Joshi, journalist
 Hashim Akhtar Naqvi (born 1948) - Indian calligrapher
 Suresh Raina (born 1986) - Indian cricketer
 Anup Jalota (born 1953) - singer
 Amitabh Bhattacharya (born 1976) - lyricist and playback singer
 Vartika Singh - Miss Diva 2019 and represented India at 68th edition of the Miss Universe pageant.
 Shalini Kapoor, IBM Fellow & CTO for AI, Climate & Sustainability - AI Applications, IBM

See also
 University Ground (University of Lucknow)

References

External links

 

 
1921 establishments in British India
British colonial architecture in India
Educational institutions established in 1921
University of Lucknow
Universities in Uttar Pradesh
Walter Burley Griffin buildings